Freethought Day is October 12, the annual observance by freethinkers and secularists of the anniversary of the effective end of the Salem Witch Trials.

History
The seminal event connected to Freethought Day is a letter written by then Massachusetts Governor William Phips in which he wrote to the Privy Council of the British monarchs, William and Mary, on this day in 1692.  In this correspondence he outlined the quagmire that the trials had degenerated into, in part by a reliance on "evidence" of a non-objective nature and especially "spectral evidence" in which the accusers claimed to see devils and other phantasms consorting with the accused. Note that, contrary to what has been claimed by some, there was no specific order or edict by Phips to ban "spectral evidence" from all legal proceedings.  Rather, this was one concern that brought about Phips' stopping the proceedings.  When the trials ultimately resumed, "spectral evidence" was allowed but was largely discounted and those convicted were swiftly pardoned by Phips. In the time leading up to the trials being stopped, it was actually clerics including the famous Cotton Mather, often portrayed as the chief villain in the hysteria, who took the lead in advising cautions against the use of "spectral evidence."  The Rev. Increase Mather, Cotton's father, specifically condemned "spectral evidence" in his book 'Cases of Conscience', in which he stated that, "It were better that ten suspected witches should escape, than that one Innocent Person should be Condemned." It was this shift in sentiment, no doubt aided by the escalating hysteria and the fact that accusations were beginning to reach higher into the Massachusetts Bay Colony hierarchy, that led to Phips' action.

Observations
Freethought Week is often observed during the week in which October 12 falls or Freethought Month during October. Organizers of these events are hoping to show the public that atheists are just like everyone else, that they are involved in the community and family-friendly.

Sacramento Freethought Event
Since 2002, Freethought Day has been observed in Sacramento as a free event, open to the public and held outdoors. Dubbed a "festival of reason" the annual event often features live entertainment and speakers similar to a rally, and is funded through a dinner or reception. "(Freethought Day) is really all about the celebration of the separation of church and state. We also celebrate the First Amendment, and science, and reason and progress" according to the event's organizer, David Diskin.

The 2007 event held at Waterfront Park started with a reading of the Phipps letter. Bands, speakers, bounce house and more, “It’s just a chance for us to show people we don’t have horns and tails”  Mayor Heather Fargo issued a proclamation for Freethought Day in Sacramento.

In 2016, the event was renamed "California Freethought Day" to reflect the growth of the event spanning the last 15 years. Several hundred attended in 2016, with the theme "#SecularPride". Diskin quoted in the Sacramento Bee said that this is a day for people to meet others and '"work together to move society forward with a firm reliance on reason and humanity.'"

California Freethought Days
Highlights of past events.

References

External links
 Freethought Day at SecularSeasons.org 
 California Freethought Day

Freethought
October observances